Reservoir is a 1961 painting by American artist Robert Rauschenberg. The work is one of his Combines, which incorporate both two- and three-dimensional found, non-art materials, using objects Rauschenberg collected from the streets of his lower Manhattan neighborhood. Reservoir is in the collection of the Smithsonian American Art Museum, in Washington, D.C. According to the museum, the artwork incorporates a length of wood, two clocks, and two cast-off wheels which evoke the always changing and surprising contrasts of everyday experience. The seemingly spontaneous arrangement of objects and the quick, gestural brushstrokes evoke the legacy of Abstract Expression. The two clocks record the time he started making the artwork and the moment he considered it finished.

References

1961 paintings
Works by Robert Rauschenberg
Paintings in the collection of the Smithsonian American Art Museum